Arra Krisette San Agustin (born April 25, 1995) is a Filipino actress, host, model, and singer.

She was one of the top 6 finalists of the sixth season of StarStruck, a reality-based talent search show of GMA Network. She was a mainstay of the longest-running sketch comedy program on Philippine television, Bubble Gang, until May 2022. She was tagged as “the newest gem of drama” this 2019.

Biography

2015–2017: Stint in Starstruck VI, Career Beginnings and Encantadia
During her StarStruck stint in 2015, San Agustin was studying psychology at De La Salle University and graduated a year later.

Thereafter, she landed bit roles in several shows such as Maynila, Magpakailanman, Karelasyon, Dear Uge, and Usapang Real Love Presents: Perfect Fit. She joined the cast of GMA's longest running gag show, Bubble Gang in 2016.

After a short appearance as Mia in Meant To Be, San Agustin was given the role of Ariana, the "sarkosi" or reincarnation of Amihan in the 2016 fantasy series, Encantadia.

2018: Supporting roles and hosting stint
In 2018, she played Anna Lazaro in the sci-fi action series, The Cure opposite Ken Chan and after the show ended, she was once again paired with Ken in the drama, My Special Tatay as his childhood best friend and love interest, Carol Flores.

At present, San Agustin hosts Taste MNL, a GMA online exclusive show where she takes netizens to the most popular and buzzed-about restaurants around the metro for a full gastronomic adventure.

2019–present: Transition to lead roles 
In 2019, San Agustin gets lead role for the first time as Audrey Segundo in the drama Madrasta together with Juancho Trivino.

In 2022, San Agustin gets another lead role as Bella Melendez in the adventure series Lolong together with Ruru Madrid

Personal life
She was born in Oriental Mindoro, and raised in Cavite. She has always been into singing and music. San Agustin was quoted, "I am a Christ believer and I'm very proud of it." She first entered into a relationship with basketball player Thomas Torres. After her relationship with Torres, she then became involved in a relationship with basketball player Juami Tiongson.

Discography

Singles

Filmography

Television series

Television shows

References

External links
Sparkle profile

1995 births
Living people
De La Salle University alumni
Filipino television actresses
Filipino female models
Participants in Philippine reality television series
StarStruck (Philippine TV series) participants
GMA Network personalities
People from Bacoor
Actresses from Cavite
People from Cavite
People from Oriental Mindoro
Tagalog people
21st-century Filipino actresses
21st-century Filipino women singers